Neil Galanter is an American pianist in Los Angeles, California, who is a leading specialist in researching and performing the works of Iberian/Spanish, Catalan, Belgian, and other European composers including Mompou, Montsalvatge, Granados, Albeniz,  Blancafort, Espla, and Poot. He has also given the Australian, New Zealand, and European premieres of several works of such composers, including a work written for him by the British composer William Blezard in 2001. According to a reviewer of one of his performances on an Australian tour,

He debuted as a pianist at age 12 with the Detroit Symphony Orchestra.

He has a bachelor's degree in music from University of Michigan, a Masters in performance from Temple University, and a Doctorate from University of Southern California. He also studied at the Juilliard School and the Manhattan School of Music.

On a tour in 2000, he performed in Brisbane, Australia, in Dunedin, New Zealand, and at the Music Centre in Christchurch, New Zealand.

In October 2007, he performed as a soloist with the Valley Symphony Orchestra, conducted by Robert Chauls, on October 13, 2007. He performed Concerto for Piano by Belgian composer Marcel Poot.

He served as music director at the "first anniversary gala" of the "88’s Cabaret" in West Hollywood, California in May, 2008.
He has worked with the Spanish and Flamenco dancer Inesita in cross genre, collaborative fusion performances of Spanish music and dance from varying centuries and styles including recent performances throughout California.

References

External links
Youtube video: "Poot: Concerto for Piano 1st Movement-NEIL GALANTER, pianist"
Neil Harris Galanter - pianist: Various Recordings/Discography

American classical pianists
American male classical pianists
Living people
University of Michigan School of Music, Theatre & Dance alumni
USC Thornton School of Music alumni
Manhattan School of Music alumni
21st-century classical pianists
21st-century American male musicians
21st-century American pianists
Year of birth missing (living people)